This is a list of former officials who served during the Trump administration who endorsed Joe Biden in the 2020 presidential campaign. Those who were appointed by Trump, rather than holdovers from the Obama administration or temporarily acting, are marked with an asterisk (*).

Justice Department officials

 A. Lee Bentley III, U.S. Attorney for the Middle District of Florida (2014–2017)
Daniel Bogden, U.S. Attorney for the District of Nevada (2009–2017, 2001–2006)
Michael W. Cotter, U.S. Attorney for the District of Montana (2009–2017)
Deirdre M. Daly, U.S. Attorney for the District of Connecticut (2013–2017)
 James Comey, Director of the Federal Bureau of Investigation (2013–2017), Deputy Attorney General (2003–2005)
 Karen L. Loeffler, U.S. Attorney for the District of Alaska (2009–2017)
 Kenneth Magidson, U.S. Attorney for the Southern District of Texas (2011–2017)
Carole Rendon, U.S. Attorney for the Northern District of Ohio (2016–2017)
Kevin W. Techau, U.S. Attorney for the Northern District of Iowa (2014–2017)
John W. Vaudreuil, U.S. Attorney for the Western District of Wisconsin (2010–2017)
Sally Yates, Acting U.S. Attorney General (2017), U.S. Deputy Attorney General (2015–2017), U.S. Attorney for the Northern District of Georgia (2010–2015)

White House officials

Brett McGurk, Special Presidential Envoy for the Global Coalition to Counter the Islamic State of Iraq and the Levant (2015–2018)
Omarosa,* Director of Communications for the Office of Public Liaison (2017–2018)
 Anthony Scaramucci,* former White House Director of Communications (2019)
 Robert Shanks,* former Peace Corps General Counsel
 Olivia Troye,* former Homeland Security adviser and lead COVID-19 adviser to Mike Pence (2018–2020)
 Alexander Vindman,* Director for European Affairs of the U.S. National Security Council (2018–2020)

State Department officials
 Tracey Ann Jacobson, Acting Assistant Secretary of State for International Organization Affairs (2017), U.S. Ambassador to Kosovo (2012–2015), U.S. Ambassador to Tajikistan (2006–2009)
 Kristie Kenney, Counselor of the United States Department of State (2016–2017)
 Nancy McEldowney, Director of the Foreign Service Institute (2013–2017), U.S. Ambassador to Bulgaria (2008–2009)
 Roberta S. Jacobson, Assistant Secretary of State for Western Hemisphere Affairs (2011–2016), U.S. Ambassador to Mexico (2016–2018)

U.S. Ambassadors

 Greg Delawie, U.S. Ambassador to Kosovo (2015–2018)
 Kathleen A. Doherty, U.S. Ambassador to Cyprus (2015–2018)
 Linda Thomas-Greenfield, Assistant Secretary of State for African Affairs (2013–2017), Director General of the Foreign Service (2012–2013), U.S. Ambassador to Liberia (2008–2012)
 S. Fitzgerald Haney, U.S. Ambassador to Costa Rica (2015–2017)
 Roberta S. Jacobson, U.S. Ambassador to Mexico (2016–2018)
 Karen Kornbluh, Member of the Broadcasting Board of Governors (2014–present), U.S. Ambassador to the Organisation for Economic Co-operation and Development (2009–2012)
 Deborah R. Malac, U.S. Ambassador to Uganda (2016–2020), U.S. Ambassador to Liberia (2012–2015)
 James D. Melville Jr., U.S. Ambassador to Estonia (2015–2018)
 Nancy Bikoff Pettit, U.S. Ambassador to Latvia (2015–2019)
 Dana Shell Smith, U.S. Ambassador to Qatar (2014–2017)
 Karen Clark Stanton, U.S. Ambassador to East Timor (2014–2017)
 Julie Furuta-Toy, U.S. Ambassador to Equatorial Guinea (2016–2019)
 Marie Yovanovitch, U.S. Ambassador to Ukraine (2016–2019), U.S. Ambassador to Armenia, (2008–2011), U.S. Ambassador to Kyrgyzstan (2005–2008)

Defense Department officials

 Paul J. Selva,* Vice Chairman of the Joint Chiefs of Staff (2015–2019)
 Francis D. Vavala, Adjutant General of the Delaware Army National Guard (1999–2017)

Homeland Security Department officials
 John Mitnick,* former Department of Homeland Security General Counsel (2018–2019)
 Elizabeth Neumann,* former Department of Homeland Security Assistant Secretary for Counterterrorism and Threat Prevention (2016–2020)
 Miles Taylor,* Chief of Staff to Department of Homeland Security Secretary Kirstjen Nielsen (2019)
 William H. Webster, Chair of the Homeland Security Advisory Council (2005–2020), Director of Central Intelligence (1987–1991), Director of the Federal Bureau of Investigation (1978–1987), Judge of the U.S. Court of Appeals for the Eighth Circuit (1973–1978), Judge of the U.S. District Court for the Eastern District of Missouri (1970–1973), U.S. Attorney for the Eastern District of Missouri (1960–1961)

Other executive branch officials

Richard Cordray, Director of the Consumer Financial Protection Bureau (2012–2017), 2018 Democratic nominee for Governor of Ohio
Esther Kiaʻāina, Assistant Secretary of the Interior for Insular Areas (2014–2017)
 Vivek Murthy, U.S. Surgeon General (2014–2017)
Sonny Ramaswamy, Administrator of the National Institute of Food and Agriculture (2012–2018)
 Janet Yellen, Chair of the Federal Reserve (2014–2018), Vice Chair of the Federal Reserve (2010–2014), Member of the Federal Reserve Board of Governors (2010–2018, 1994–1997), President of the Federal Reserve Bank of San Francisco (2004–2010), Chair of the Council of Economic Advisers (1997–1999)

See also
 43 Alumni for Biden
 List of Joe Biden 2020 presidential campaign endorsements
 List of Republicans who opposed the Donald Trump 2016 presidential campaign
 List of Republicans who opposed the Donald Trump 2020 presidential campaign
 Never Trump movement
 REPAIR
 Republican Voters Against Trump
 Right Side PAC
 The Lincoln Project

References

Joe Biden 2020 presidential campaign
Lists of United States presidential candidate endorsements
Lists of people by ideology
Never Trump movement
Donald Trump-related lists
Joe Biden-related lists
Republican Party (United States)-related lists
2020-related lists